Miniature art includes paintings, engravings and sculptures that are very small; it has a long history that dates back to prehistory.  The portrait miniature is the most common form in recent centuries, and from ancient times, engraved gems, often used as impression seals, and cylinder seals in various materials were very important.  For example most surviving examples of figurative art from the Indus Valley civilization and in Minoan art are very small seals.   Gothic boxwood miniatures are very small carvings in wood, used for rosary beads and the like.

Western paintings in illuminated manuscripts are known as miniatures, even if not very small - this sense of the word in fact has a different derivation, from a Latin word for a reddish pigment.
Miniature art has been made for over 2500 years and is prized by collectors.  Museums around the world have collections of miniature paintings, drawings, original prints and etchings, and sculpture.

Miniature art societies, such as the World Federation of Miniaturists (WFM) and Royal Miniature Society, provide applicable of the maximum size covered by the term. An often-used definition is that a piece of miniature art can be held in the palm of the hand, or that it covers less than 25 square inches or 100 cm². Some exhibits require the subjects to be depicted in 1/6 actual size, and in all paintings the spirit of miniaturisation should be maintained.

Collecting
Miniature Art Societies hold annual shows around the world. The Miniature Painters, Sculptors & Gravers Society of Washington, DC, is the oldest miniature art society in the USA. The Miniature Art Society of Florida is possibly one of the largest miniature art shows in the USA. Galleries such as Seaside Art Gallery, The Snowgoose Gallery, and the Ciders Painters of America also hold annual exhibitions where visitors are invited to view the paintings and sculptures under magnifying lenses.

Artists of the miniature art genre

Artists known for working in miniature include:
 Gopal prasad sharma  (India)
 Aman Singh Gulati (India)
 Margaret Hicks (US)
 Mahmoud Farshchian (Iran)
 Jonty Hurwitz (UK, South Africa)
 Debra Keirce (US)
 Karen Latham (US)
 Willard M. Mitchell (Canada)
 Henry Saxon (UK)
 Suvigya Sharma (India)
 Magda Szabo (Canada)
 Narcissa Niblack Thorne (US)
 Bashir Ahmed (Pakistan)
 Joris Hoefnagel (the Netherlands)
 Ludwik Marteau (Poland)
 Fernando García del Molino (Argentina)
 Miss Archibald Ramsay Douglas (UK)
 Penelope Cleyn (UK)
 Nihâl Chand (India)
 Joan Carlile (UK)
 Anna Maria Carew (UK)
 Moshe Bromberg (Poland)
 Mir Musavvir (Safavid Era)
 Christian Backer-Owe (Norway)
 Dust Muhammad (Safavid Era)
 Peter Paillou (UK)
 Pyotr Sokolov (Russia)
 Gunasekaran Sundarraj (India)
 Mohamed Temam (Algeria)
 Élisabeth Terroux (Switzerland)
 Henry Tanworth Wells (UK)
 Abdullah Buhari (Turkey)
 Nakkaş Sinan Bey (Turkey)
 Abdulcelil Levni (Turkey)
 Nakkaş Osman (Turkey)
 Matrakçı Nasuh (Turkey)
 Mir Sayyid Ali (Afghanistan)
 Nusret Çolpan (Turkey)
 Mallikarjuna Reddy (India)
 Nikolai Aldunin (Russia)
 Anatoly Konenko (Russia)
 Hagop Sandaldjian (Egypt)
 Rina Vellichor (Russia)
 Graham Short (UK)
 Willard Wigan (UK)
 Reza Abbasi (Iran)
 Members of the Royal Society of Miniature Painters, Sculptors and Gravers

See also 

 Scale model
 Diorama
 Room box
 Dollhouse
 Model building
 Miniature faking
 Portrait miniature
 Model figure
 Akan goldweights
 Ottoman miniature
 Artist trading cards
 Netsuke
 Mstyora miniature
 Wasli
 List of gold-glass portraits

References

Further reading
 
 
 
 
 
 
 
 
 
 
 
 
 
 
 

Visual arts genres